Earl Lewis Thomas (October 4, 1948 – July 4, 2020) was an American professional football player who was a wide receiver in the National Football League (NFL). He played six seasons for the Chicago Bears, the St. Louis Cardinals, and the Houston Oilers.  His brothers Mike Thomas and Jimmy Thomas also played in the NFL.

References 

1948 births
2020 deaths
People from Greenville, Texas
Players of American football from Texas
American football wide receivers
Houston Cougars football players
Chicago Bears players
St. Louis Cardinals (football) players
Houston Oilers players
American football tight ends